This article is a list of major entertainment events held in Greater Moncton.

Infrequent events
Infrequent events of over 5000 people in attendance.

Annual events

See also
 Moncton
 Riverview
 Dieppe

References
 

Festivals in Moncton
Moncton
New Brunswick-related lists
Lists of events in Canada